Hieronyma crassistipula is a species of plant in the family Phyllanthaceae, which was recently separated from the Euphorbiaceae. It is endemic to Cuba.

References

Flora of Cuba
crassistipula
Critically endangered plants
Taxonomy articles created by Polbot
Taxobox binomials not recognized by IUCN